Old Town Historic District is a national historic district located at Clearfield, Clearfield County, Pennsylvania.  The district includes 19 contributing buildings in Clearfield.  The district is exclusively residential and consists of notable Victorian style dwellings built from 1860 to 1890.

It was added to the National Register of Historic Places in 1979.

References

Historic districts on the National Register of Historic Places in Pennsylvania
Greek Revival houses in Pennsylvania
Victorian architecture in Pennsylvania
Buildings and structures in Clearfield County, Pennsylvania
National Register of Historic Places in Clearfield County, Pennsylvania